The First Sealand dynasty, (URU.KÙKI) or the 2nd Dynasty of Babylon (although it was independent of Amorite-ruled Babylon), very speculatively c. 1732–1460 BC (short chronology), is an enigmatic series of kings attested to primarily in laconic references in the king lists A and B, and as contemporaries recorded on the Assyrian Synchronistic king list A.117. Initially it was named the "Dynasty of the Country of the Sea" with Sealand later becoming customary. The dynasty, which had broken free of the short lived, and by this time crumbling Old Babylonian Empire, was named for the province in the far south of Mesopotamia, a swampy region bereft of large settlements which gradually expanded southwards with the silting up of the mouths of the Tigris and Euphrates rivers (the region known as mat Kaldi "Chaldaea" in the Iron Age). Sealand pottery has been found at Girsu, Uruk, and Lagash but in no site north of that. The later kings bore pseudo-Sumerian names and harked back to the glory days of the dynasty of Isin. The third king of the dynasty was even named for the ultimate king of the dynasty of Isin, Damiq-ilišu. Despite these cultural motifs, the population predominantly bore Akkadian names and wrote and spoke in the Akkadian language. There is circumstantial evidence that their rule extended at least briefly to Babylon itself. In later times, a Sealand province of the Neo-Babylonian Empire also existed.

History

Traditionally, all that was known about Sealand came from a few Kings List entries and the stray chronicle mention. It has been suggested that much of the writing in this period used waxed wooden boards, as a way of explaining the paucity of standard tablets found. Recently (2009) 450 published tablets mainly from the Martin Schøyen collection, the largest privately held collection of manuscripts to be assembled during the 20th century, cover a 15 to 18 year period extending over part of each king’s reign. They seem to originate from a single cache but their provenance was lost after languishing in smaller private collections since their acquisition on the antiquities market a century earlier. Most of the tablets pertain to
administration of resources. An additional 32 unpublished Sealand tablets are held in Brussels. The tablets include letters, receipts, ledgers, personnel rosters, etc., and provide year-names and references which hint at events of the period. Messengers from Elam are provisioned, Anzak, a god of Dilmun (ancient Bahrain) appears as a theophoric element in names, and Nūr-Bau asks whether he should detain the boats of Ešnunna, a rare late reference to this once thriving Sumerian conurbation. In addition to normal commercial activity, two omen texts from another private collection are dated to the reign of Pešgaldarameš and a kurugu-hymn dedicated to the gods of Nippur mentions Ayadaragalama. A variant version of the Epic of Gilgameš relocates the hero to Ur and is a piece from this period.

Excavations conducted between 2013 and 2017 at Tell Khaiber, around 20 km from Ur, have revealed the foundations of a large mudbrick fortress with an unusual arrangement of perimeter close-set towers. The site is dated, by an archive of 152 (after joins were made) clay cuneiform  tablets found there, to Ayadaragalama. Tablets at Tell Khaiber fell into the same short time period as those published from the Schoyen Collection, that being the later part of Pešgal and early part of Ayadara reigns. Excavators were also able to develop a stratified ceramic array for Sealand allowing other sites to be identified. Sealand ceramics and faunal remains were found at the site of Tell Sakhariya, a few miles east of Ur.

The home city of the Sealand Dynasty is currently unknown. A kings list fragment states that Babylon's "kingship passed to E'urukuga". Given its site being known as uru.ku this capital has been speculated as being Lagash of which little is known in this period. Nippur, and Tell Deḥaila are also in consideration. Modern thinking is that the capital was a Dūr-Enlil (or Dūr-Enlile). There was a Dūr-Enlil in Neo-Babylonian times in the general area between Uruk and Larsa as well as one in Neo-Assyrian times. It is not clear it either is the same place as the potential Sealand capital.

The King list tradition

The king list references which bear witness to the sequence of Sealand kings are summarized below:

An additional king list provides fragmentary readings of the earlier dynastic monarchs. The king list A totals the reigns to give a length of 368 years for this dynasty. The Synchronistic King List A.117 gives the sequence from Damqi-ilišu onward, but includes an additional king between Gulkišar and Pešgaldarameš, mDIŠ-U-EN (reading unknown). This source is considered reliable in this respect because the forms of the names of Pešgaldarameš and Ayadaragalama match those on recently published contemporary economic tablets (see below).

Rulers

Ilum-ma-ilī

Ilum-ma-ilī, or Iliman (mili-ma-an), the founder of the dynasty, is known from the account of his exploits in the Chronicle of Early Kings which describes his conflicts with his Amorite Babylonian contemporaries Samsu-iluna and Abi-ešuḫ. It records that he “attacked and brought about the defeat of (Samsu-iluna’s) army.” He is thought to have conquered Nippur late in Samsu-iluna’s reign as there are legal documents from Nippur dated to his reign. Abi-eshuh, the Amorite king of Babylon, and Samsu-iluna’s son and successor, “set out to conquer Ilum-ma-ilī,” by damming the Tigris, to flush him out of his swampy refuge, an endeavor which was apparently confounded by Ilum-ma-ilī’s superior use of the terrain.

Damqi-ilišu

The last surviving year-name for Ammi-ditana commemorates the “year in which (he) destroyed the city wall of Der/Udinim built by the army of Damqi-ilišu. In the original "MU am-mi-di-ta-na LUGAL.E BÀD.DA UDINIMki.MA (ÉREN) dam-qí-ì-lí-šu.KE4 BÍ.IN.DÙ.A BÍ.IN.GUL.LA". This is the only current contemporary indication of the spelling of his name, contrasting with that of the earlier king of Isin.

Gulkišar

Gulkišar, meaning “raider of the earth,” has left few traces of his apparently lengthy reign. He was the subject of a royal epic (Tablet HS 1885+ plus 2 recent fragment joins) concerning his enmity with Samsu-ditāna, the last king of the first dynasty of Babylon. The text describes Gulkišar addressing his troops and being accompanied by the god Istar. The colophon of a tablet giving a chemical recipe for glaze reads “property of a priest of Marduk in Eridu,” thought to be a quarter of Babylon rather than the city of Eridu, is dated mu.us-sa Gul-ki-šar lugal-e "year after (the one when) Gul-kisar (became?) king.” A kudurru of the period of Babylonian king Enlil-nādin-apli, c. 1103–1100 BC, records the outcome of an inquiry instigated by the king into the ownership of a plot of land claimed by a temple estate. The governors of Bit-Sin-magir and Sealand, upheld the claim based on the earlier actions of Gulkišar who had “drawn for Nanse, his divine mistress, a land boundary.” It is an early example of a Distanzangaben statement recording that 696 years had elapsed between Nabû-kudurrī-uṣur, Enlil-nādin-apli’s father, and Gulkišar.

Pešgaldarameš and Ayadaragalama

Pešgaldarameš, “son of the ibex,” and Ayadaragalama, “son of the clever stag,” were successive kings and descendants (DUMU, "sons" in its broadest meaning) of Gulkišar.

Ayadaragalama’s reign seems to have been eventful, as a year-name records expelling the “massed might of two enemies,” speculated to be Elamites and Kassites, the Kassites having previously deposed the Amorites as rulers in Babylon. Another records the building of a “great ring against the Kalšu (Kassite) enemy” and a third records the “year when his land rebelled.” A year-name gives “year when Ayadaragalama was king – after Enlil established (for him?) the shepherding of the whole earth,” and a list of gods includes Marduk and Sarpanitum, the tutelary deities of the Sealand.

A neo-Babylonian official took a bronze band dedicatory inscription of A-ia-da-a-ra, MAN ŠÚ “king of the world,” to Tell en-Nasbeh, probably as an antique curio, where it was discarded to be found in the 20th century.

Ea-gâmil

Ea-gâmil, the ultimate king of the dynasty, fled to Elam ahead of an invading horde led by Kassite chief Ulam-Buriaš, brother of the king of Babylon Kashtiliash III, who conquered the Sealand, incorporated it into Babylonia and “made himself master of the land.” Agum III, successor to Ulam-Buriaš, is also described as attacking Sealand and destroying a temple in "Dūr-Enlil".

A serpentine or diorite mace head or possibly door knob found in Babylon, is engraved with the epithet of Ulaburariaš, “King of Sealand”. The object was excavated at Tell Amran ibn-Ali, during the German excavations of Babylon, conducted from 1899 to 1912, and is now housed in the Pergamon Museum.

See also
Tell Khaiber
Chronology of the ancient Near East
List of Mesopotamian dynasties

Inscriptions

Notes

References

Further reading
Al-Zubaidi, Ahmed K. Taher, and Mohammed S. Attia, "A Cylinder Seal From TELL Abu Al-Dhahab Dated To THE First Sealand Dynasty (1740–1374 BC)", IRAQ 83, pp. 13-24, 2021
Boivin, Odette, "Kār-Šamaš as a South-Western Palace Town of the Sealand I Kingdom", NABU, pp. 162–64, 2015
Boivin, Odette, "Kār-Šamaš as a South-Western Palace Town of theSealand I Kingdom", NABU, pp. 162–64, 2015
Boivin, Odette., On the Origin of the Goddess Ištar-of-the-Sealand, Ayyabītu. NABU, pp. 24–26, 2015
Calderbank, Daniel, "Pottery from Tell Khaiber: a craft tradition of the first Sealand dynasty", Moonrise Press Ltd, 2021
Calderbank, Daniel, "Moulding Clay to Model Sealand Society Pottery Production and Function at Tell Khaiber, Southern Iraq", The University of Manchester (United Kingdom), 2018
Cavigneaux, Antoine and Béatrice André-Salvini. Forthcoming. Cuneiform tablets from Qal’at Dilmun and the Sealand at the dawn of the Kassite era. In Twenty years of Bahrain Archaeology, 1986–2006. Actes du colloque international de Manama, 9–12 décembre 2007, ed. Pierre Lombard et al. Bahrain: Ministry of Culture
Dalley, Stephanie, "Gods from North-eastern and North-western Arabia in Cuneiform Texts from the First Sealand Dynasty, and a Cuneiform Inscription from Tell en-Nasbeh, c. 1500 BC", Arabian Archaeology and Epigraphy 23, pp. 177–85, 2013
de Ridder, Jacob Jan, "HS 200B: A Bridal Gift (Tuppu Bibli) from the First Sealand Dynasty.", Journal of Cuneiform Studies 73.1, pp. 89-102, 2021
Gabbay, Uri, "A balaĝ to Enlil from the First Sealand Dynasty", Zeitschrift für Assyriologie und vorderasiatische Archäologie 104.2, pp. 146-170, 2014
Højlund, Fleming, "Dilmun and the Sealand", Northern Akkad Project Reports 2, pp. 9–14, 1989
Zadok, Ran, "On Population Groups in the Documents from the Time of the First Sealand Dynasty", Tel Aviv 41, pp. 222–37, 2014

External links
The Art of Conservative Rebellion: A Short Introduction to the First Sealand Dynasty ASOR ANE Today - June 2021

States and territories established in the 18th century BC
States and territories disestablished in the 15th century BC
Babylonian dynasties
Chaldea